Palmans was a Belgian professional road and cyclo-cross cycling team that existed from 1993 until 2010. The team underwent many different name changes throughout its existence, but was always sponsored by Palmans, an international road transport company.

In 2000, the team merged with Collstrop, another Belgian team.

The team disbanded for two years in 2004. Part of the staff and Palmans, the main sponsor, helped form a new Belgian team, . In 2006,  split in two. Part of the team became  and the other returned to Palmans–Collstrop. In 2010, the team permanently disbanded.

Major wins

Races
 Omloop van het Waasland : Jan Bogaert (1994), Wim Omloop (1997), Geert Omloop (2003)
 Omloop van het Houtland : Jans Koerts (1995), Niko Eeckhout (2000), Geert Omloop (2001, 2003)
 Le Samyn : Hans De Meester (1996)
 Grote 1-MeiPrijs : Peter Spaenhoven (1997), Geert Omloop (2001), Roger Hammond (2002)
 Grand Prix d'Isbergues : Magnus Bäckstedt (1997), Peter Van Petegem (2001)
 Circuit Franco-Belge : Frank Høj (1998)
 Nokere Koerse : Hendrik Van Dijck (2000)
 Circuito Montañés : Dave Bruylandts (2000)
 Kampioenschap van Vlaanderen : Niko Eeckhout (2000)
 Kuurne–Brussels–Kuurne : Peter Van Petegem (2001)
 Tour Beneden-Maas : Geert Omloop (2001), Roger Hammond (2002)
 Grand Prix de Denain : Bert Roesems (2003)
 Antwerpse Havenpijl : Rob Goris (2010)
 Schaal Sels : Aidis Kruopis (2010)

National championships 
2003
  Belgium Road Race, Geert Omloop
  Britain Road Race, Roger Hammond
2008
  Finland Time Trial, Matti Helminen

References

UCI Continental Teams (Europe)
Cycling teams based in Belgium
Cycling teams established in 1993
Cycling teams disestablished in 2010
1993 establishments in Belgium
2010 disestablishments in Belgium